Roger Calvin Ellis (February 1, 1938 – May 14, 2008)  was an American football linebacker and center who played four seasons with the New York Titans of the American Football League. He played college football at the University of Maine for the Maine Black Bears football team.

References

1938 births
2008 deaths
American football linebackers
American football centers
Maine Black Bears football players
New York Titans (AFL) players
New York Jets players
Players of American football from Boston
American Football League players